Sulaiman Hamad (born 19 May 1994, in Jeddah) is a Saudi Arabian judoka. He competed at the 2016 Summer Olympics in the men's 66 kg, in which he was eliminated in the second round by Davaadorjiin Tömörkhüleg. He was the flag bearer for Saudi Arabia at the Parade of Nations.

In July 2021, he competed in the men's 73 kg event at the 2020 Summer Olympics in Tokyo, Japan.

References

External links
 

1994 births
Living people
Saudi Arabian male judoka
Olympic judoka of Saudi Arabia
Judoka at the 2016 Summer Olympics
Judoka at the 2020 Summer Olympics
Judoka at the 2014 Asian Games
Judoka at the 2018 Asian Games
Asian Games competitors for Saudi Arabia
20th-century Saudi Arabian people
21st-century Saudi Arabian people